Jesse Little Thrash (October 21, 1880 – December 12, 1942) was a college football player and engineer.

Georgia Tech
Thrash was a prominent tackle for the Georgia Tech Yellow Jackets football teams of the Georgia Institute of Technology. He was inducted into the Georgia Tech Athletics Hall of Fame posthumously in 1962.

1902
He was selected All-Southern in 1902, listed by various sources as Tech's first ever All-Southern football player. Despite Tech losing every game, he began the season as a sub and closed it as the undisputed star of the Tech team.

1903
Thrash was captain of the 1903 team.

Personal life
Jesse's sons Kenneth Thrash and William G. Thrash also played football for Tech. His great niece Maria Thrash is a swimming coach, coaching the Tech swimming teams in 2003.

See also
1902 College Football All-Southern Team

References

External links

1880 births
1942 deaths
American football tackles
Georgia Tech Yellow Jackets football players
All-Southern college football players
Players of American football from Georgia (U.S. state)